Micralarctia semipura is a moth of the family Erebidae. It was described by Max Bartel in 1903. It is found in Tanzania.

References

 

Endemic fauna of Tanzania
Spilosomina
Moths described in 1903